The Southern Connecticut Owls (also Southern Connecticut State  Owls and SCSU Owls) are the athletic teams that represent Southern Connecticut State University, located in New Haven, Connecticut, in NCAA Division II intercollegiate sports. The Owls' 17 athletic teams, seven for men and 10 for women, compete as members of either the Northeast-10 Conference or the Eastern College Athletic Conference. SCSU has been a member of the NE-10 since 2000.

There have been 10 NCAA National Championship Teams at Southern, as well as 75 NCAA Individual Champions in the sports of Track and Field, Swimming and Gymnastics.

Sports sponsored

Soccer 

SCSU's men's soccer team won titles in 1987, 1990, 1992, 1995, 1998, 1999. The six titles are the most for any Division II men's soccer team in the country.  The program has appeared in 32 NCAA Division II Tournaments, 17 NCAA Final Four appearances, and has produced 52 All-Americans, 15 Senior Bowl Players, 4 National Player of the Year Award Winners, and 1 Golden Boot Award (Top Goalkeeper in any NCAA Division) winner.

Basketball 
On March 24, 2007, the women's basketball team won the NCAA Division II championships. In a 61–45 victory, SCSU beat the previously undefeated Florida Gulf Coast.

Gymnastics 
The street circle in front of the Moore Fieldhouse is named in honor of former Olympian Abie Grossfeld, former head gymnastics coach at the university.

Swimming 
The swimming and diving team scored their highest at the NCAA championship meet in March for the years 2007 and 2008.

Football 
Elm City rivalry

SCSU's football program has produced coaches and players who went on to the National Football League.

Alumni in the NFL
Active Coaches
 Jeff Stoutland — Linebackers coach (1984-1985), Offensive coordinator (1988-1992)
 Tim Holt — Tight ends coach & Assistant offensive line coach (1995-1996), Running backs coach (2005-2007)
Former Coaches
 Kevin Gilbride — Quarterback and Tight end, Head coach (1980-1984)
 Chris Palmer — Quarterback (1969-1971)
 Nick Nicolau — Running back (1957-1959), Assistant coach (1960)
Former NFL Players
 Scott Mersereau — Defensive tackle for the New York Jets (1987-1993)

Volleyball 
SCSU's volleyball program had its most successful seasons in 2017–18 and in 2018–19. The Owls had their first National Tournament berth in 2017 with a record of 24–11. They ended their campaign in the second round of the National Tournament when they lost to New Haven. In 2018, the Owls won their first-ever NE-10 Conference Title against American International College. The Owls then had their second berth into the National Tournament, bust lost in the first round.

National championships
The Owls have won ten NCAA team national championships.

Team

References

External links